Costante Adolfo Bossi (1876 – 1953) was an Italian organist, composer and teacher. He was the brother of Marco Enrico Bossi and son of Pietro Bossi.

He taught at the Milan Conservatory.

External links
http://www.organ-biography.info/index.php?id=Bossi_Adolfo_1876

1876 births
1953 deaths
20th-century classical composers
Italian classical composers
Italian male classical composers
20th-century Italian composers
20th-century Italian male musicians